Henry Edward Cooper (15 October 1845 – 1 July 1916) was an Anglican bishop in Australia.

He was born on 15 October 1845, educated at Trinity College, Dublin and  ordained in 1872. He was Vicar of Hamilton, Victoria then  Archdeacon of Ballarat. In 1895 he was created Bishop Coadjutor of Ballarat. In 1901 he became fourth Bishop of Grafton and Armidale, then, in 1914, first Bishop of Armidale following the division of the diocese. Cooper died on 1 July 1916.

Notes

1845 births
Alumni of Trinity College Dublin
Anglican bishops of Armidale
Anglican bishops of Grafton and Armidale
Anglican archdeacons in Australia
20th-century Anglican bishops in Australia
1916 deaths